David Joe Hayes (born August 30, 1966) is an American politician of the Republican Party. He was a member of the Washington House of Representatives, representing the 10th Legislative District from 2013 to 2019.

Career
Hayes enlisted in the U.S. Navy and served as an aircraft mechanic. Hayes, a deputy with the Snohomish County Sheriff, served as president of the Washington Council of Police and Sheriffs from 2010-2013.

References

External links 
 Dave Hayes at ballotpedia.org

1966 births
Living people
Republican Party members of the Washington House of Representatives
21st-century American politicians
People from Camano, Washington